Retinoblastoma-binding protein 5 is a protein that in humans is encoded by the RBBP5 gene.

Function 

The protein encoded by this gene is a ubiquitously expressed nuclear protein and belongs to a highly conserved subfamily of WD-repeat proteins. It is found among several proteins that bind directly to retinoblastoma protein, which regulates cell proliferation. The encoded protein interacts preferentially with the underphosphorylated retinoblastoma protein via the E1A-binding pocket B.

Interactions 

RBBP5 has been shown to interact with:
 ASCL2,
 MLL,
 MLL3,  and
 NCOA6.

References

Further reading